ERT3 is a regional broadcasting center in Thessaloniki that belongs to the Hellenic Broadcasting Corporation (ERT), the public service broadcaster in Greece. It provides radio and television programming with Northern Greek perspectives.

Services
Television
ERT3 (Available nationwide)
Radio
102 FM
95,8 FM
Trito Programma Vrahea (closed)

Hellenic Broadcasting Corporation
Mass media in Thessaloniki
Television channels and stations established in 1988